Lusotitan is a genus of herbivorous brachiosaurid sauropod dinosaur from the Late Jurassic Period of Portugal.

Discovery and naming
In 1947 Manuel de Matos, a member of the Geological Survey of Portugal, discovered large sauropod fossils in the Portuguese Lourinhã Formation that date back to the Tithonian stage of the Late Jurassic period. In 1957 Albert-Félix de Lapparent and Georges Zbyszewski named the remains as a new species of Brachiosaurus: Brachiosaurus atalaiensis. The specific name referred to the site Atalaia. In 2003 Octávio Mateus and Miguel Telles Antunes named it as a separate genus: Lusotitan. The type species is Lusotitan atalaiensis. The generic name is derived from Luso, the Latin name for an inhabitant of Lusitania, and from the Greek word "Titan", a mythological giant.

The finds consisted of a partial skeleton lacking the skull and individual vertebrae uncovered in several locations. De Lapparent did not assign a holotype. In 2003 Mateus chose the skeleton as the lectotype. Its bones have the inventory numbers MIGM 4798, 4801–10, 4938, 4944, 4950, 4952, 4958, 4964–6, 4981–2, 4985, 8807, and 8793-5. These remains include 28 vertebrae and elements of the appendicular skeleton.

The lectotype was re-described by Mannion and colleagues in 2013.

Description

Paleoecology

The Lourinhã Formation of western Portugal was likely to be formed during the Kimmeridgian or Tithonian ages of the Late Jurassic period. The area is a coastal region with a strong marine influence. Its flora and fauna are similar to the Morrison Formation in the United States, and the Tendaguru Formation in Tanzania. Lusotitan is the largest dinosaur that has been discovered in the area. Lusotitan lived alongside species of the predatory theropods Allosaurus (A. europaeus), Ceratosaurus, Lourinhanosaurus, and Torvosaurus, the ankylosaurian Dracopelta, the sauropods Bothriospondylus, Lourinhasaurus, and Zby, and the stegosaurs Dacentrurus and Miragaia.

References 

Brachiosaurs
Tithonian life
Late Jurassic dinosaurs of Europe
Jurassic Portugal
Fossils of Portugal
Lourinhã Formation
Fossil taxa described in 2003
Taxa named by Miguel Telles Antunes
Taxa named by Octávio Mateus